Sarah Robertson may refer to:

 Sarah Robertson (painter) (1891–1948), Canadian painter
 Sarah Robertson (field hockey) (born 1993), Scottish field hockey player
 Sarah Robertson (academic), professor of reproductive immunology
 Sarah Robertson (rugby union) (born 1969), English rugby union player